Mahapatabadige Anthony Crisman Kivlojiyas Perera (born 13 September 1921 – died 20 May 1988 as ඇන්තනී සී. පෙරේරා) [Sinhala]), popularly as Anthony C. Perera, was an actor in Sri Lankan cinema and theater. One of the earliest pillars in Sri Lankan film history, Perera also worked as a singer, screenplay writer and director in his career that spanned more than four decades.

Personal life
Perera was born on 13 September 1921 in a small village of Mahawewa Vee Hena, Chilaw, in Puttalam as the eldest of the family. His father Mahapatabedige Logus Perera was born in Tudella, Ja-Ela, who worked as a plantation administrator. His mother was Warnasuriyage Theodora Tissera. He entered Mahawewa Junior School for primary education and then moved to Tudella Roman Catholic College (currently known as Christ King College, Tudella) for further education. Then with his father's transfer to a new plantation in Kurunegala, Perera shifted to Budupitiya Roman Catholic School which was about 7 miles from Kurunegala.

Perera has one younger brother, Wilfred and one younger sister, Beatrice. Wilfred later became a distinguished teacher at St. Benedict's College, Kotahena and produced several popular figures, including; Vijaya Kumaratunga, Ravindra Randeniya and Robin Fernando.

He was married to Modarage Mary Vaas. The wedding was celebrated in 1953. The couple has five daughters - Menaka, Deepthika, Gaurika, Chaudry, Sherine - and two sons - Rohana and Emil. His elder son Rohana died at young age by an accident.

Perera died on 20 May 1988 at the age of 66 and buried in Thudella Cemetery, Ja-Ela.

Career
After finishing school career in brief years, he moved to his ambition to be an actor. Anthony went to find Laddie Ranasinghe to be a stage actor and joined with Ranasinghe's Arcadians Drama Troupe. Meantime, Laddie introduced Perera to one of his colleagues, P.D.S. Kularatne, who worked as the principal of Ananda College, Colombo. Kularatne has set up a theater club called "National" in Maradana and he joined Perera for his newest drama Aewessa Bena.

However after that play, he refused to act in further and applied to the Ceylon Army and Race Horse. He received calls to come to both on the same day. 
In 1942, Perera got the opportunity to join the British Army. For five and a half years, Perera fought with the forces of the Allies against the enemy in the jungles of the desert. After returning to Sri Lanka, he joined the public service. He worked in Kurunegala Kachcheri for a brief period and then joined as an agent for Brookbond Company, Colombo. There he joined the 1953 Hartal to seek professional rights. He was a hard leftist at the time. Due to the continuous Hartal, Brookbond manager transferred Anthony to Negombo branch of the company. He also worked as the production manager of Vijaya Studios in Hendala.

After many years in civil service, Perera met one of his friends, H. M. L. Tissera, who owns Ratnavali Cinema, Ja-Ela. Tissera introduced Perera to K. Gunaratnam, who owns Cinemas Film Corporation. During that time, Perera met Hugo Fernando and got the opportunity to act in the film Suraya co-directed by Indian filmmakers S. V. Krishna Reddy and T. R. Sundaram. Then he acted in many popular films such as Wana Mohini, Sandesaya, Weera Vijaya and Ranmuthu Duwa. He has acted more than 70 films across many genres from character roles to comedy roles. In 1965, Perera introduced Sonia Disa into Sinhala Cinema.

He acted many comedy roles in films Hathara Denama Surayo, Edath Suraya Adath Suraya, Allapu Gedara, Chandiya and Singapore Charlie. He acted in five different roles in the film Hondama Welawa. He starred in the film Singapore Charlie wearing a wig and also worked as the dialogue writer. In 1980, he made screenplay, story and dialogue and directed the film Hondin Inna. After 1977, he did not receive many films. During this free period, he enjoyed reading Paddle Chase novels. In 1986, he produced the stage play Yama Lowa Peraliya.

Filmography

References

External links

1988 deaths
1921 births
20th-century Sri Lankan male singers
Sri Lankan Roman Catholics
Sri Lankan male film actors
Sinhalese male actors
Sinhalese singers